Larry Fogle (born March 19, 1953) is a retired American basketball player. He was an American Basketball Association (ABA) and National Basketball Association (NBA) draft pick. He played in two games for the New York Knicks during 1975–1976 before playing for the CBA and starring on the Rochester Zeniths 1977–78 championship team.

Background
Fogle, born in Brooklyn, New York, played basketball at Cooley High School in Detroit, Michigan. In February 1972, Fogle established a city league single-game scoring record of 73 points (versus Cody High); at season's end, Larry Fogle was named Michigan High School Player of the Year by the Detroit News. Upon graduating from Cooley, Fogle played collegiate basketball for the University of Southwestern Louisiana (now the University of Louisiana at Lafayette) and Canisius College.

A 6' 5" (1.96 m) and 205 lb (93 kg) guard, Fogle was selected as an underclassman in the 1974 ABA draft in the eighth round by the Denver Nuggets after leading the NCAA in individual scoring, averaging 33.4 points per game and 14 rebounds per game in the 1973–74 season.  That year Fogle was named an All-American by the United States Basketball Writers Association  and the National Association of Basketball Coaches named him a third team All-American.  Fogle opted to stay in college and the following year he was drafted in the second round of the 1975 NBA Draft by the New York Knicks and in the fifth round of the 1975 ABA Draft by the Spirits of St. Louis.

Fogle played for the Knicks in the 1975-76 NBA season, appearing in two games and scoring two points to go with three rebounds.

References

External links
Larry Fogle NBA statistics, basketballreference.com

1953 births
Living people
African-American basketball players
All-American college men's basketball players
American expatriate basketball people in the Philippines
American men's basketball players
Basketball players from New York City
Canisius Golden Griffins men's basketball players
Denver Nuggets draft picks
Jersey Shore Bullets players
Louisiana Ragin' Cajuns men's basketball players
New York Knicks draft picks
New York Knicks players
Parade High School All-Americans (boys' basketball)
Philippine Basketball Association imports
Rochester Zeniths players
Shooting guards
Spirits of St. Louis draft picks
Sportspeople from Brooklyn
Basketball players from Detroit
Cooley High School alumni
21st-century African-American people
20th-century African-American sportspeople